John Gordon (born 25 November 1978) is a New Zealand badminton player. He competed at the 2002 Commonwealth Games, and won a bronze medal in the mixed team event.

Achievements

Oceania Championships 
Men's doubles

BWF International Challenge/Series 
Men's singles

Men's doubles

 BWF International Challenge tournament
 BWF International Series tournament

References

External links 
 

1978 births
Living people
Sportspeople from Wellington City
New Zealand male badminton players
Commonwealth Games bronze medallists for New Zealand
Badminton players at the 2002 Commonwealth Games
Commonwealth Games medallists in badminton
Medallists at the 2002 Commonwealth Games